Raunioissa is the fourth studio album by the Finnish death metal band Sotajumala. It entered the Finnish billboard charts at position 4 on its release week.

All tracks written by Sotajumala

References

Sotajumala albums
2015 albums